Space Opera is a 1974 anthology of classic science fiction short stories edited by Brian Aldiss.

Contents
"Introduction" (Brian W. Aldiss)
"Is Everything an Illusion?" (Brian W. Aldiss)
"Zirn Left Unguarded, the Jenghik Palace in Flames, Jon Westerley Dead" (1972) (Robert Sheckley)
"Honeymoon in Space" (excerpt from A Honeymoon in Space) (1968) (George Griffith)
"The Red Brain" (1927) (Donald Wandrei) (appeared in Futura edition only)
"Tonight the Sky Will Fall" (1952) (Daniel F. Galouye)
"Precipices of Light That Went Forever Up ...." (Brian W. Aldiss)
"The Star of Life" (excerpt) (1947) (Edmond Hamilton)
"After Ixmal" (1962) (Jeff Sutton)
"Sea Change" (1956) (Thomas N. Scortia)
"Exile Is Our Lot" (Brian W. Aldiss)
"Breaking Point" (1953) (James E. Gunn) (appeared in Futura edition only)
"Colony" (1953) (Philip K. Dick) (did not appear in Futura edition)
The Sword of Rhiannon (excerpt) (1949) (Leigh Brackett)
"All Summer in a Day" (1954) (Ray Bradbury)
"The Mitr" (1953) (Jack Vance)
"The Godlike Machines" (Brian W. Aldiss)
"The Storm" (1943) (A. E. van Vogt)
"The Paradox Men" (1949) (Charles Harness)
"Time Fuze" (1954) (Randall Garrett)
"The Last Question" (1956) (Isaac Asimov)
"Answer" (1954) (Fredric Brown) (appeared in Futura edition only)
"Envoi" (Brian W. Aldiss)

References

Science fiction anthologies
1974 anthologies